Empire of Dark Salvation is the second studio album from gothic/industrial metal band Gothminister.

Track listing

Live video

Notes 
Drum recording by Lars Klokkerhaug in Sub Sonic Society Studios, Oslo  Live sound recordings by Guido Fricke at M'Era Luna Festival 2004 in Hildesheim, Germany

References

Gothminister albums
2005 albums